Light Refracted is a two-movement composition for chamber ensemble by the American composer Jennifer Higdon.  It was first performed on September 22, 2002 at the Kimmel Center for the Performing Arts by the clarinetist Igor Begelman, violinist Jo-Young Baek, violist Christina Castelli, cellist Mark Kosower, and pianist Tatiana Goncharova.

Composition
Light Refracted has duration of roughly 20 minutes and is composed in two movements:
Inward
Outward

Inspiration
Higdon described the inspiration of the piece in the score program notes, writing:

Instrumentation
The work is scored for a small ensemble comprising a clarinet, violin, viola, cello, and piano.

Reception
Reviewing the world premiere, Daniel Webster of The Philadelphia Inquirer praised the piece, writing:
Reviewing a later recording the work, Dan Visconti of NewMusicBox also praised the music, remarking, "The work follows out of Higdon’s popular orchestral work Blue Cathedral. Inspired by Monet's studies of the same subject viewed in different light, Higdon takes another look at her own musical materials and the result is a compelling two-movement work that becomes even more interesting for listeners who are already familiar with Blue Cathedral and will be able to appreciate the many ways that Higdon recasts that material."  Richard Whitehouse of Gramophone compared the piece to Higdon's other chamber music, remarking, "Light Refracted (2002) adopts a different strategy in which the image of the title is conveyed by two distinct movements: the 'Inward' process characterised by ruminative and eloquently sustained music, the 'Outward' process represented by compact and vigorous music that does not so much balance as cancel out its predecessor."

See also
List of compositions by Jennifer Higdon

References

Compositions by Jennifer Higdon
2002 compositions
Chamber music compositions